Hans Berg (25 February 1902 – 15 August 1980) was a Norwegian politician for the Christian Democratic Party.

He was born in Bodin.

He was elected to the Norwegian Parliament from Nordland in 1954, and was re-elected on three occasions.

Berg was mayor of Bodin municipality during the period 1951–1955, and in total he held various positions here from 1936 to 1967.

References

1902 births
1980 deaths
Christian Democratic Party (Norway) politicians
Members of the Storting
Politicians from Bodø
20th-century Norwegian politicians